The Order of the Flag of Republika Srpska is an Order of the Republic of Srpska. It was established in 1993 by the Constitution of Republika Srpska and 'Law on orders and awards' valid since 28 April 1993.

Ranks
The Order of the Flag of the Republika Srpska was established in two ranks. The first rank is the Order of the Flag with a gold wreath, and the second rank is the Order of the Flag with a silver wreath.

The Order of the Flag with a gold and silver wreath is awarded for work and extraordinary merits in the post-war development of Republika Srpska, strengthening peace and international cooperation, for results and achievements of wider significance and scale in the affirmation of Republika Srpska. 
The motto of the Order is: He who shines on people must himself be light.

Notable recipients

With gold wreath
 2020 -  Aleksandar Vulin
 2019 -  Chen Bo, Ambassador of the People's Republic of China to Bosnia and Herzegovina
 2019 -  Pyotr Ivantsov
 2018 -  Emir Kusturica
 2017 -  Vitaly Churkin

With silver wreath
 2020 -  Vladimir Nikolic
 2018 -  Johann Gudenus
 2018 -  Pavel Dorokhin
 2016 -  José Mujica

See also 
 Flag of Republika Srpska
 Orders, decorations and medals of Republika Srpska

References

Orders, decorations, and medals of Republic of Srpska
Awards established in 1993